Eburodacrys triocellata is a species of beetle in the family Cerambycidae. It was described by Carl Stål in 1857.

References

Eburodacrys
Beetles described in 1857